Ioannis Georgios Lavrentis was a Greek athlete who was likely the second runner to win a marathon. On March 12, 1896, he was first in a field of 38 runners attempting to qualify for the 1896 Summer Olympics in Athens, Greece (3:11:27).

One month later, he was one of 17 athletes to compete in the first Olympic marathon. Seven runners, including Lavrentis, did not finish the race.

References

External links

Year of birth missing
Year of death missing
Greek male long-distance runners
Greek male marathon runners
Olympic athletes of Greece
Athletes (track and field) at the 1896 Summer Olympics
19th-century sportsmen
Place of birth missing
Place of death missing